Nguti is a town and commune in Cameroon. The town covers an area of 1.851 km2. Nguti once had an airstrip, used for the transport of medicine and equipment, but is no longer in use.

Geography 
The commune extends over the northern part of the department of Koupé-Manengouba, it borders eight Cameroonian communes: Mamfé, Tinto, Fontem, Santchou, Melong, Bangem, Konye and Toko.

People 
During the 2005 census, the commune had 27151 inhabitants, with 4560 living in the main town (Nguti town).

Notable People of Nguti 
 Nzo Ekangaki, politician
 Hon. Chief Justice Asu Mbanda
 Dr. Simon A. Munzu (fmr. Ass. U.N Sec Gen)
 Dr. Mbu Etonga
 Dr. Bernard Nzo-Nguty
 Mr. Emmanuel Njang
 Ndor Johnson Okie
 Chief Justice Epuli
 Roman Oben (New York Giants)
 Mr. Osohmboh Mbu
 Mr. Elombi George
 Mr. Emmanuel Ayompe
 Mr. Jackson Kepe

External links

Citation

 
Populated places in Cameroon
Populated places in Southwest Region (Cameroon)